Umeå FC is a Swedish professional football club located in Umeå, Sweden. The club, formed in 1987, is currently playing in the third tier of the Swedish league, Ettan Fotboll. The club is affiliated to the Västerbottens Fotbollförbund.

Season to season

Players

Current squad

Notable players
  Alexis Bbakka
  Gbenga Arokoyo
  Adam Chennoufi
  Soya Takahashi
  Björn-Erik Sundqvist
  Karl Morten Eek
  Andrée Jeglertz
  Dan Burlin
  Andreas Dahlén
  Anthony Allison
  Frane Lojić
  Daniel Severino
  Nicklas Maripuu
  Andrew Jean-Baptiste
  David Myrestam
  Mohamed Kamanor
  Seif Kadhim
  Suad Gruda
  Andreas Hermansson
  Abdul Mumuni
  Per Joar Hansen
  Jesper Blomqvist
  Tommy Lycén
  Robert Mambo Mumba
  Jonas Wallerstedt
  Shamo Quaye
  Mikael Dahlberg
  Ryan Gilligan
  Mikael Lustig
  Francis Koroma
  Brian Wake
  Andriy Fedorenko
  Leszek Iwanicki
  Samir Šarić
  Steve Galloway
  Pilip Vaitsiakhovich
  Dean Holness
  Ivan Trubochkin
  Roger Sandberg
  Ibrahim Kallay
  Victor Mansaray
  Yann-Alexandre Fillion
  Zachary Sukunda
  Tim Markström
  Leo Englund
  Zaur Svanadze
  Petter Augustsson
  Omar el Baad

Attendances
In recent seasons Umeå FC have had the following average attendances:

Achievements
 Division 1 Norra:
 Winners (1): 1995, 2011
 Runners-up (2): 1994, 1998

References

External links
  of Umeå FC 

Football clubs in Västerbotten County
Allsvenskan clubs
Sport in Umeå
Association football clubs established in 1987
1987 establishments in Sweden